The 1968 Washington gubernatorial election took place on November 5, 1968, and resulted in the re-election of Republican incumbent Daniel J. Evans over state Attorney General John J. O'Connell. Martin Durkan, Albert F. Canwell, and John Patric unsuccessfully ran in the blanket primary.

General election

Results

References

1968
1968 United States gubernatorial elections
Gubernatorial
November 1968 events in the United States